Jan Korejs (27 April 1907 – 8 August 1949) was a Czech athlete. He competed in the men's pole vault at the 1936 Summer Olympics.

References

1907 births
1949 deaths
Athletes (track and field) at the 1936 Summer Olympics
Czech male pole vaulters
Olympic athletes of Czechoslovakia
Place of birth missing